Edgard Luca (born 5 October 1941) is a Belgian rower. He competed in the men's coxed pair event at the 1960 Summer Olympics.

References

1941 births
Living people
Belgian male rowers
Olympic rowers of Belgium
Rowers at the 1960 Summer Olympics
Sportspeople from West Flanders